Coliseo de la Ciudad Deportiva is an indoor sporting arena located in Havana, Cuba. Built in 1957, the Coliseum is one of the most important works of Cuban Civil Engineering. It is located at the intersection of Boyeros and Vía Blanca avenues in the Cerro Municipality. The capacity of the arena is for 15,000 spectators.

Architecture

The building was designed by Nicolás Arroyo Márquez & Gabriela Menéndez García-Beltrán of the architecture firm Arroyo y Menendez Architects.

Construction of the Coliseum began in November 1952. It is a 20,000 m² circular concrete building with an outside diameter of 103.2 meters and is located at the confluence of the Vía Blanca and Avenida de Rancho Boyeros.

It is supported by 48 columns distributed in two concentric circles of 24 columns each. The inner circle is 62.8 meters in diameter and the outer 88.30. From this last circle, a cantilever with a span of 7.45 meters is projected on which rests a 24 cm thick prestressed concrete plate at a height of 6.65 meters above ground level. The capacity of the building is 15,000 people and one of its most notable aspects is the exit system, which is planned so that all attendees can exit rapidly.

The reinforced concrete dome that covers the facility is 88 meters in diameter without any interior support is supported by a circular post-tensioned concrete beam that rests on the 24 exterior columns, with a seesaw-shaped seat that allows it to carry out the small movements of expansion and contraction due to changes in temperature. This dome was carried out by an American company and the other works were undertaken by the former Ministry of Public Works.

The Coliseum serves indoor sports, it has Volleyball and Basketball courts, Rhythmic Gymnastics, Aerobic Musical Gymnastics, and other recreational activities, it has a Gym located under the stands.

Sculpture

In front of the coliseum, there is a bronze statue of a naked woman running with open arms the work entitled La Meta and is by the sculptor Fernando Boada Martín and made between 1936-1937.

1959 trials

February 16, 1959, Jesús Sosa Blanco (1907/08 - February 18, 1959) who had been a colonel in the Cuban army under Fulgencio Batista was arrested and charged by the Fidel Castro government with having committed 108 murders under the Batista regime. Sosa's televised trial took place in the Havana Coliseo de la Ciudad Deportiva before 17,000 spectators. Before his execution, he was heard to say that the trial scene was "worthy of ancient Rome".

Interest

On March 1, 2016, in honor of the ailing Fidel Castro, The Rolling Stones announced they'd be playing a free concert at the arena on March 25. It was the first open air concert by a British rock band in the country's history.

Gallery

See also

 Havana Plan Piloto

 National Theatre of Cuba

 Mario Romañach

 Josep Lluís Sert

 Town Planning Associates
 Jesús Sosa Blanco

Notes

References

External links
 Trials Make 'roman Holiday' (1959)

 1959 - Military tribunal puts Batista colonel Sosa Blanco on trial in the Havana Sports Palace of Cuba.

Indoor arenas in Cuba
Buildings and structures in Havana
Architecture in Havana
Sports venues in Havana